Events from the year 2000 in Nepal.

Incumbents 

 Monarch: King Birendra
 Prime Minister: Girija Prasad Koirala (from March 2000) and Krishna Prasad Bhattarai (1999	— March 2000)
 Chief Justice: Keshav Prasad Upadhyaya

Events 

 Usha Khadgi is crowned Miss Nepal.
 26 May – National Human Rights Commission is established.
 27 July – Nepal Airlines de Havilland Canada DHC-6 Twin Otter crashes in  Dadeldhura District killing 25 people.

Births 
  17 June –  Supriya Maskey, Nepalese beauty queen
 2 August –  Sandeep Lamichhane, cricketer
 12 December – Princess Purnika, Princess

Deaths

 28 March – Gaje Ghale, Gurkha recipient of the Victoria Cross.
 27 May – Agansing Rai, Gurkha recipient of the Victoria Cross.
 August 6 – Praveen Gurung, singer

References 

 
Nepal
Nepal
2000s in Nepal
Years of the 20th century in Nepal